Boonooroo Plains is a rural locality in the Fraser Coast Region, Queensland, Australia.

References 

Fraser Coast Region
Localities in Queensland